Golf in the United States is played by about 25 million people, or 8% of the population.

Professional golf is aired on several television networks, such as Golf Channel, NBC, ESPN, TNT, CBS and Fox.

Organizations

USGA 

The United States Golf Association has about 10,000 club members and courses. The organization is responsible of the Rules of Golf together with the British-based R&A.

The USGA conducts national championships open to professionals: the U.S. Open (since 1895), U.S. Women's Open (since 1946), U.S. Senior Open (since 1980), and U.S. Senior Women's Open (since 2018), as well as national championships for amateur, juniors, seniors and four-ball teams.

The USGA co-organizes the Walker Cup and Curtis Cup together with the respective British & Irish organizations, and competes at the Eisenhower Trophy and Espirito Santo Trophy, which are amateur tournaments for national teams. Also, the USGA gives the Bob Jones Award recognition of distinguished sportsmanship in golf since 1955.

PGA of America 

The Professional Golfers' Association of America was founded in 1916 and has 28,000 club professional members. They organize three tournaments for tour players: the PGA Championship (since 1916), Senior PGA Championship (since 1937) and Women's PGA Championship (since 2015), as well as the PGA Professional National Championship (since 1968) for club players. The PGA of America also co-organizes the Ryder Cup and PGA Cup.

Professional tours 

The PGA Tour is the main professional golf tour in the United States. It was established by the PGA of America in 1929 and was spun off in 1968.

Its calendar features the four major tournaments and World Golf Championships, but do not organize them. The PGA Tour organizes several tournaments, most notably The Players Championship and Tour Championship. In addition it co-organizes the biennial Presidents Cup.

The PGA Tour also operates other professional tours. The Korn Ferry Tour is the developmental tour since 1990. PGA Tour Champions has been the main senior tour since 1980, and the PGA Tour organizes two of the five senior major championships: The Tradition and Senior Players Championship. The organization also operates tours in Canada, Latin America and China.

There is not a well defined third tier of golf tours in the United States. The larger regional tours include the Gateway Tour and Swing Thought Tour; there is a constantly changing roster of small "mini-tours".

The LPGA Tour is the main women's professional tour, founded in 1950. Its calendar features several major championships and national golf opens. It organizes several tournaments, including the ANA Inspiration, one of the major tournaments, and the CME Group Tour Championship. The LPGA Tour also co-organizes the biennial Solheim Cup. The Symetra Tour has been the official development tour of the LPGA Tour since 1999.

Media

Television 

The current television partners of the PGA Tour are CBS, NBC and the Golf Channel. NBC also airs the British Open, Ryder Cup, Presidents Cup and Solheim Cup. CBS also carries the Masters and PGA Championship. The Golf Channel also carries the European Tour and LPGA Tour.

Fox has a contract with the USGA since 2015 to air the U.S. Open, U.S. Women's Open and  U.S. Senior Open.

ESPN aired several golf tournaments from 1979 to 2015. It carries the early rounds of the Masters and the PGA Championship.

Magazines 

Notable dedicated magazines include Golf Digest (1950, Condé Nast), Golf Magazine (1959, Time Inc.), Golfweek (1975, Gannett), and Links (1988, Purcell).

Notable American golfers

Men 

Jack Nicklaus - 18 major championship wins
Tiger Woods - 15 major championship wins
 Walter Hagen - 11 major championship wins
 Ben Hogan - 9 major championship wins
Tom Watson- 8 major championship wins
 Bobby Jones - 7 major championship wins
Arnold Palmer - 7 major championship wins
Gene Sarazen - 7 major championship wins
Sam Snead - 7 major championship wins
Lee Trevino- 6 major championship wins
 Phil Mickelson - 6 major championship wins

Women 

 Amy Alcott - 5 major championship wins
 Patty Berg - 15 major championship wins
 Pat Bradley - 6 major championship wins
 Juli Inkster - 7 major championship wins
 Betsy King - 6 major championship wins
 Betsy Rawls - 8 major championship wins
 Patty Sheehan - 6 major championship wins
 Louise Suggs - 11 major championship wins
 Kathy Whitworth - 6 major championship wins
 Mickey Wright - 13 major championship wins
 Babe Zaharias - 10 major championship wins

Notable golf courses 

 Midwest

 Crystal Downs Country Club - Frankfort, Michigan
 Dubsdread - Lemont, Illinois
 Erin Hills - Erin, Wisconsin
 Hazeltine National Golf Club - Chaska, Minnesota
 Inverness Club - Toledo, Ohio
 Medinah Country Club - Medinah, Illinois
 Muirfield Village - Dublin, Ohio
 Oakland Hills Country Club - Bloomfield Township, Michigan
 Sand Hills Golf Club - Mullen, Nebraska
 Valhalla Golf Club - Louisville, Kentucky
 Whistling Straits – Haven, Wisconsin

 Southeast

 Augusta National Golf Club - Augusta, Georgia
 East Lake Golf Club - Atlanta, Georgia
 Kiawah Island Golf Resort – Kiawah Island, South Carolina
 PGA National Golf Club - Palm Beach Gardens, Florida
 Pinehurst Resort – Pinehurst, North Carolina 
 Seminole Golf Club - Juno Beach, Florida
 Southern Hills Country Club - Tulsa, Oklahoma
 TPC at Sawgrass - Ponte Vedra Beach, Florida

 Northeast

 Baltusrol Golf Club - Springfield, New Jersey
 Bethpage Black Course – Farmingdale, New York
 Congressional Country Club - Bethesda, Maryland
 Fishers Island Club - Fishers Island, New York
 Merion Golf Club - Ardmore, Pennsylvania
 National Golf Links of America - Southampton, New York
 Oak Hill Country Club - Pittsford, New York
 Oakmont Country Club - Oakmont, Pennsylvania
 Pine Valley Golf Club - Pine Valley, New Jersey
 Shinnecock Hills Golf Club - Southampton, New York
 The Country Club - Brookline, Massachusetts
 Winged Foot Golf Club - Mamaroneck, New York

 West

 Cypress Point Club - Pebble Beach, California
 Olympic Club - San Francisco, California
 Pebble Beach Golf Links - Pebble Beach, California
 Riviera Country Club - Pacific Palisades, California
 Southern Highlands Golf Club - Las Vegas, Nevada
 Torrey Pines Golf Course - La Jolla, California

See also 

 World Golf Hall of Fame
 NCAA Division I Men's Golf Championships
 NCAA Division I Women's Golf Championships
 American Junior Golf Association
 Sports in the United States

References

External links 

 United States Golf Association official website
 Professional Golfers' Association of America official website
 United States Golf Teachers Federation official website
 Professional Golf Teachers Association of America official website
 PGA Tour official website
 LPGA official website